Das Himmelskleid (La veste di cielo) is a 1927 German-language opera in 3 acts by Ermanno Wolf-Ferrari after "Donkeyskin" by Charles Perrault. It premiered 21 April 1927 at the Nationaltheater, Munich.

Recording
Angelina Ruzzafante, Sibrand Basa, Reinhard Leisenheimer, Hagen Opera Gerhard Markson Marco Polo 3CD 1997

References

Operas by Ermanno Wolf-Ferrari
German-language operas
1927 operas
Operas
Operas based on works by Charles Perrault